"Turkey Dinner" is the sixth episode of the seventh series of the British comedy series Dad's Army. It was originally transmitted on Monday, 23 December 1974. Although not a Christmas special, it was the Christmas episode, and was originally planned for transmission on 6 December 1974.

Plot
Mr. Blewitt has finished painting a wooden plaque on Captain Mainwaring's office door, and Mainwaring has finished writing a speech for an upcoming rotary dinner. Mainwaring tells Sergeant Wilson that before a battle, their commander told them a joke. However, when Mainwaring attempts to cheer up his unusually quiet platoon with a joke about an Englishman, a Welshman and a Scotsman, it does not work. Jones asks Mainwaring if he and his section can speak to him in private. Once in the office, Jones admits that he took his section for a quick drink in the Horse and Groom. Mainwaring is less than impressed, and is annoyed when he hears that they also stopped in the King's Head to stop Cheeseman shivering, and then the Goat and Compasses.

Mainwaring is then amused to learn that Godfrey had begun to sing rather raucously, so he was taken into the Red Lion to sober up. The landlord had come up to Jones and had told him about something rustling in the haystack. Jones shot at the rustler, and was shocked to learn that it was a turkey - which is now plucked and stuffed in his refrigerator! Mainwaring is shocked, and insists that they pay Mr Boggis, a farmer at the North Berrington Turkey Farm, the only place where the turkey could have come from, for the loss of his turkey. However, Mr Boggis is not there.

Eventually they discover Mr Boggis is at market day; however the farm worker is unwilling to accept money for the bird unless he is certain that one is missing. They attempt to count the birds, and discover after much chaos that no birds are missing. Therefore, Jones' section decides to hold a turkey dinner for the OAPs of Walmington-on-Sea. Mainwaring is delighted and decides to organise a Turkey Dinner General Purposes Committee, with himself as chairman, of course. Mrs Fox will cook the turkey, Mrs Pike will make the stuffing, and Mrs Cheeseman will do the gravy.

Everything goes well, until Mainwaring emerges from the office in his dinner suit: he is guest speaker at a Rotary Club dinner. Pike whirls around with a plate in his hand, and accidentally spills gravy all over Mainwaring's suit. Jones uses blotting paper to get rid of the gravy, but ends up making a mess of Mainwaring's shirt, which he covers up with white enamel paint, which ends up on Mainwaring's dinner jacket.

A sling is the only answer to the problems, as it will not only hide the paint, but it will also make Mr Mainwaring appear more brave at the dinner. However, Hodges comes bursting through the door, bumping into Pike, and knocking gravy onto his sling once again resulting in Mainwaring giving his trademark catchphase, "You Stupid Boy!".

Cast

Arthur Lowe as Captain Mainwaring
John Le Mesurier as Sergeant Wilson
Clive Dunn as Lance Corporal Jones
John Laurie as Private Frazer
Arnold Ridley as Private Godfrey
Ian Lavender as Private Pike
Bill Pertwee as ARP Warden Hodges
Talfryn Thomas as Private Cheeseman
Edward Sinclair as The Verger
Frank Williams as The Vicar
Harold Bennett as Mr Blewett
Pamela Cundell as Mrs Fox
Janet Davies as Mrs Pike
Olive Mercer as Mrs Yeatman
Dave Butler as Farmhand

References

    

Dad's Army (series 7) episodes
1974 British television episodes